Athletes from the Socialist Federal Republic of Yugoslavia competed at the 1968 Summer Olympics in Mexico City, Mexico. 69 competitors, 59 men and 10 women, took part in 54 events in 11 sports.

Medalists

Athletics

Basketball

Boxing

Canoeing

Cycling

Four male cyclists represented Yugoslavia in 1968.

Individual road race
 Cvitko Bilić
 Rudi Valenčič
 Tanasije Kuvalja

Team time trial
 Cvitko Bilić
 Rudi Valenčič
 Tanasije Kuvalja
 Franc Škerlj

Gymnastics

Sailing

Shooting

Four shooters, all men, represented Yugoslavia in 1968.

50 m rifle, three positions
 Slobodan Paunović
 Vladimir Grozdanović

50 m rifle, prone
 Branislav Lončar
 Dušan Epifanić

Swimming

Water polo

Men's Team Competition
Preliminary Round (Group B)
 Defeated United Arab Republic (13:2)
 Tied with East Germany (4:4)
 Defeated Mexico (9:0)
 Defeated Netherlands (7:4)
 Lost to Italy (4:5)
 Defeated Greece (11:1)
 Defeated Japan (17:2)

Semifinals
 Defeated Hungary (8:6)

Final
 Defeated Soviet Union (13:11) →  Gold Medal

Team Roster
Ozren Bonačić
Dejan Dabović
Zdravko Hebel
Zoran Janković
Ronald Lopatny
Uroš Marović
Đorđe Perišić
Miroslav Poljak
Mirko Sandić
Karlo Stipanić
Ivo Trumbić

Wrestling

References

External links
Official Olympic Reports
International Olympic Committee results database

Nations at the 1968 Summer Olympics
1968
Summer Olympics